This is a list of the number-one hits of 2017 on the Argentine Physical Albums and Digital Songs Monthly Sales chart, ranked by CAPIF.

See also
 2017 in music
 Argentina Hot 100
 List of airplay number-one hits of the 2010s (Argentina)

References

Argentina
2017